Jodie Marie Comer (born 11 March 1993) is an English actress. She played Oksana Astankova / Villanelle in the BBC America spy thriller Killing Eve (2018–2022), in which she received critical acclaim and won a British Academy Television Award for Best Actress and a Primetime Emmy Award for Outstanding Lead Actress in a Drama Series. Her major film roles include Millie Rusk / Molotov Girl in Free Guy (2021), and Marguerite de Carrouges in The Last Duel (2021).

Born and raised in Liverpool, Comer began her career in an episode of The Royal Today in 2008. Following appearances in several television series, she landed the roles of Chloe Gemell in the E4 comedy-drama series My Mad Fat Diary (2013–2015) and Kate Parks in the BBC One drama series Doctor Foster (2015–2017). In between the series, Comer received critical acclaim for her portrayal as Ivy Moxam in the BBC Three drama miniseries Thirteen. Her other major television roles include Elizabeth of York in the Starz historical miniseries The White Princess (2017), and Sarah in the Channel 4 television film Help (2021). Comer made her West End debut in Suzie Miller's play Prima Facie at the Harold Pinter Theatre in 2022 which earned her a nomination for the 2023 Laurence Olivier Award for Best Actress in a Leading Role in a Play.

Early life
Jodie Marie Comer was born in Liverpool on 11 March 1993, the daughter of Merseyrail employee Donna Comer and Everton FC physiotherapist James Comer. She grew up in Liverpool's Childwall suburb. She has a younger brother named Charlie (born in 1995). She attended St Julie's Catholic High School in the Liverpool suburb of Woolton, where she became close friends with future Olympic athlete Katarina Johnson-Thompson. She started acting at a local weekend drama school called CALS in the Belle Vale area of Liverpool when she was 11 years old, and it was through this school that she entered the Liverpool Performing Arts Festival in 2006 at St George's Hall and came first in her category after performing a monologue about the Hillsborough Disaster.

Comer's friends kicked her out of their high school dance group because a holiday with her family clashed with rehearsals for the school's talent show, and she instead decided to perform a monologue for the show. Although she did not win, her performance prompted the school's drama teacher to call in a favour from friends in the entertainment industry that would allow her to audition for a BBC Radio 4 play. This would become her first acting job, with her co-stars in the play advising her to get an agent and telling her that she could have a successful acting career.

Career

Career beginnings (2008–2017)
Comer's career began in 2008 with a guest role on an episode of The Royal Today, a spin-off series of the medical drama series The Royal. She then made appearances in series such as Waterloo Road, Holby City, Doctors, Silent Witness, Casualty, Law & Order: UK, Vera, and Inspector George Gently. She was cast in leading roles in the five-episode drama series Justice, the supernatural miniseries Remember Me, and as Chloe Gemell in the E4 comedy-drama series My Mad Fat Diary. Comer appeared in the 2015 adaptation of Lady Chatterley's Lover, a television film broadcast on BBC One. In the same year, Comer appeared as Kate Parks in the BBC One drama series Doctor Foster.

Comer was cast in her first starring role as Ivy Moxam in the BBC Three miniseries Thirteen, which premiered in February 2016 and earned her a nomination for the British Academy Television Award for Best Actress. In December 2016, she appeared in the BBC miniseries Rillington Place as Beryl Evans, one of serial killer John Christie’s victims. In 2016, Comer was listed as one of Screen International's "Stars of Tomorrow" in association with the BFI London Film Festival. In 2017, she starred as a young Elizabeth of York in The White Princess on Starz, a sequel to the BBC miniseries The White Queen. In 2017, she also made her feature film debut, as Christine in the Morrissey biopic England Is Mine.

Killing Eve and worldwide recognition (2018–present)
In April 2018, Comer began starring in the BBC spy thriller series Killing Eve as Villanelle, a psychopathic Russian assassin who develops a mutual obsession with Eve Polastri (played by Sandra Oh), the MI6 agent tasked with pursuing her. Comer garnered critical acclaim for her performance on the series, with Jia Tolentino of The New Yorker stating that, in the context of the show's "constant reversals in tone and rhythm", the "ambiguity—and impossibility—of Villanelle's character has worked (through the first season) thanks to Comer's mercurial, unassailable charisma". Due to her character swapping between multiple accents from around the world as part of her various disguises, much attention has been given to Comer's native Scouse accent and the surprise of viewers who hear it for the first time. For her portrayal of Villanelle, Comer has been nominated for three Primetime Emmy Awards for Outstanding Lead Actress in a Drama Series and three British Academy Television Awards for Best Actress, with her winning both in 2019.

In June 2018, Comer was one of the actresses in a series of BBC Four monologues called Snatches: Moments From Women's Lives, inspired by events that took place in the century since women first won the vote. Comer appeared in the episode "Bovril Pam", where she portrayed a secretary in 1960s Liverpool exploring her sexuality. Comer was ranked No. 94 on the Radio Times "TV 100" list for 2018. In November 2018, The Hollywood Reporter included her in their "Next Gen Talent 2018: Hollywood's Rising Young Stars" list. In April 2019, Comer was asked about upcoming work during her Happy Sad Confused podcast interview and revealed that she had been forced to drop out of Kenneth Branagh's adaptation of Agatha Christie's Death on the Nile due to scheduling conflicts.

Comer performed a cameo in the 2019 film Star Wars: The Rise of Skywalker, appearing as Rey's mother Miramir in flashbacks.

In June 2020, Comer played the lead role of Lesley in a BBC iPlayer reboot of the Talking Heads episode "Her Big Chance". The episode, directed by Josie Rourke, was filmed in lockdown due to the COVID-19 pandemic.

In December 2018, it was announced Comer had been cast in the action comedy film Free Guy, which began filming in May 2019. Comer is the female lead alongside Ryan Reynolds. She played two roles in the film: Millie, a games developer, and Molotov Girl, Millie's in-game avatar. The film was released on 13 August 2021. It later debuted on Disney Plus for home viewers on 23 February 2022. A cover version of Mariah Carey song "Fantasy" sung by Comer was used in the film. For this role, she was nominated for a Saturn Award for Best Supporting Actress.

Later in 2021, Comer teamed with writer Jack Thorne and actor Stephen Graham to star in the Channel 4 drama Help, in which she played a young care home worker struggling during the early days of the COVID-19 pandemic in the UK. She also acted as an executive producer. The role earned her a fifth British Academy Television Awards for Best Actress nomination which she ultimately won. Comer portrayed Marguerite de Carrouges in Ridley Scott's The Last Duel alongside Matt Damon, Adam Driver and Ben Affleck. The film was released worldwide on 15 October 2021.

Comer made her West End debut in Suzie Miller's play Prima Facie at the Harold Pinter Theatre which started in April 2022 and concluded in June 2022. For the role, Comer received significant critical acclaim. Comer will make her Broadway debut with Prima Facie when the production transfers from the West End, in spring 2023. Starting 21 July 2022, a filmed performance of the play at the Harold Pinter Theatre was shown at cinemas around the world by NT Live.

Upcoming projects
In March 2022, it was announced that Comer will star in and produce a limited series adaptation of Jen Beagin’s novel Big Swiss for HBO. The project will be produced by A24 and Adam McKay's Hyperobject Industries. She is also committed to star in and produce the environmental thriller The End We Start From, an adaptation of Megan Hunter's debut novel directed by Mahalia Belo. Benedict Cumberbatch's SunnyMarch and Liza Marshall's Hera Pictures will produce the project, and started filming in August 2022. In the same month, it was announced that Comer will star alongside Austin Butler and Tom Hardy in Jeff Nichols' The Bikeriders, which is a fictional story inspired by the photography of Danny Lyon and his 1967 book of the same name. The film will be released by New Regency and shall commence filming in October 2022.

Public image
In December 2018, British Vogue included Comer in their list of "The Most Influential Girls of 2018", and in February 2019 Forbes included her in their annual "30 Under 30" list for being in the top 30 most influential people in the entertainment industry in Europe under the age of 30.

In September 2019, a few days after her Emmy win, it was announced that Comer would be the face of the Loewe spring/summer 2020 fashion campaign, which saw her star in a short film for the brand that consisted of her repeating the brand's name with different emotions. On 31 March 2020, Comer was announced as the brand ambassador for skin-care brand Noble Panacea.

In 2020, Comer discussed the class discrimination she experienced during her career as someone from a working-class city.

Personal life
Comer is known for guarding her private life and relationships. She was previously active on Twitter, but left the platform in 2020 after she was harassed by fans who believed they had found proof that her American boyfriend was a supporter of Donald Trump. During an interview with InStyle magazine, she said, "It was the first time I had ever been dragged into something like that. And it wasn't just me, it was my family. I had seen the absurdity of what I was being accused of, and what my partner was being accused of. I decided for my own health that I was not going to try and convince these people otherwise. I just wasn't going to do it." She still maintains an Instagram account with over 2.4 million followers, though her posts can only be commented on by other verified profiles.

Filmography

Film

Television

Theatre

Awards and nominations

References

External links
 
 
 

1993 births
Living people
21st-century English actresses
English child actresses
English television actresses
English stage actresses
English film actresses
Actresses from Liverpool
Best Actress BAFTA Award (television) winners
Outstanding Performance by a Lead Actress in a Drama Series Primetime Emmy Award winners